Canga renatae is a species in a monotypic genus of harvestmen in the family Neogoveidae. It was discovered in 2010 in a cave system in the Serra dos Carajás, Pará State, Brazil.

References

Harvestmen
Animals described in 2010